Steve Smith (born 29 March 1973) is a retired British high jumper. Smith's indoor mark of 2.38 metres and his outdoor mark of 2.37 metres are British records in the high jump (7 feet 9 and three-quarter inches, and 7 feet 9 and one-half inches, respectively).

Biography
Smith was born in Liverpool and trained there throughout his career under coach Mike Holmes. Standing 1.85 meters tall (6 ft. 1 inch), Smith is considered "small" in comparison to most world-class high jumpers. He jumps off his left leg. He first emerged as a talented jumper in 1990, when he cleared 2.25 (7 ft 4 inches) at a British national meet in Gateshead. In 1991, he improved to 2.29, and then had his "breakout" year in 1992, improving his best by an astonishing 8 centimetres. He qualified for the 1992 Olympics in Barcelona and reached the finals, finishing in 12th place with a disappointing height of only 2.24. One month after those Olympics, he competed at the 1992 World Junior Championships, where he won, and equalled the junior world record of 2.37 metres (outdoors), which Dragutin Topic had achieved in 1990. Smith equalled this result twice more (once indoors and once outdoors.) He established his personal best of 2.38, set indoors at Wuppertal, Germany, on 4 February 1994, which still stands as the British record.

He was a bronze medalist at the 1996 Olympics in Atlanta, the first British man to win a medal in the high jump since Con Leahy in 1908. He did it with just 5 jumps: eight men cleared 2.32, but only three (Smith, Poland's Artur Partyka and American Charles Austin) successfully jumped 2.35. With their medals secured, all 3 missed their initial attempts at 2.37, Partyka then cleared on his second attempt, and Smith and Austin passed for final attempts at 2.39 which only Charles Austin cleared (for a new Olympic record).

A four-time national champion for Great Britain (AAA Championships) in the men's high jump event, Smith retired after rupturing his Achilles tendon in 1999 (a year in which he was still jumping 2.36 outdoors). During his career, Smith leaped 2.36 (7 ft 9 inches) or better at nine different competitions. While his performance at the 1996 Olympics stands as the capstone, his best year was 1993 when he placed third at both the IAAF World Championships Indoors (Toronto, Ontario, Canada, on 14 March) and Outdoors (Stuttgart, Germany, on 22 August), jumping 2.37 at both meets.

Shortly after he retired from competition, he opened a restaurant in his hometown of Liverpool in 2000 and in 2004 founded Raise the Bar, a corporate training and apprenticeship business that works with global brands.

Education
Smith was educated at the all-boys' De La Salle School in Liverpool.

Achievements

References

 Profile at The Power of Ten
 Steve Smith at Raise the Bar

1973 births
Living people
English male high jumpers
Athletes (track and field) at the 1992 Summer Olympics
Athletes (track and field) at the 1994 Commonwealth Games
Athletes (track and field) at the 1996 Summer Olympics
Olympic athletes of Great Britain
Sportspeople from Liverpool
Commonwealth Games medallists in athletics
World Athletics Championships medalists
European Athletics Championships medalists
Medalists at the 1996 Summer Olympics
Commonwealth Games silver medallists for England
Olympic bronze medallists for Great Britain
Olympic bronze medalists in athletics (track and field)
Medallists at the 1994 Commonwealth Games